Sunset Season is the debut extended play by American singer-songwriter and social media personality Conan Gray. It was released under Republic Records on November 16, 2018. Sunset Season was primarily produced by Dan Nigro and co-produced by Conan Gray, who also wrote and composed the five-track EP. Gray released "Idle Town", "Generation Why", and "Crush Culture" as singles. The EP peaked at number two on the US Heatseeker Albums chart, and at number 116 on the Billboard 200 chart.

Background 
Gray has cited Lorde's debut album, Pure Heroine, as a major inspiration for the EP because of its small-town nostalgia.

In November 2019, Gray took to Twitter to celebrate the one year anniversary of the EP's release, stating "can't even begin to explain how much these five songs changed my life, so i’m not even going to try to. just. i'm happier now than i've ever been my whole entire life. so thank u." The tweet featured a screenshot of the EP's growth on Spotify, showing that it had gained over 145 million streams in one year.

Sunset Shows 

To promote Sunset Season, Gray embarked on his first concert tour, Sunset Shows. The 2019 tour began on March 10 in Seattle and ended on April 13 in Salt Lake City after visiting 24 cities in North America. Norwegian singer Girl in Red served as the opening act for every show.

Credits and personnel
Credits adapted from Tidal.
 Conan Gray – vocalist , lyricist , producer , keyboard , additional vocals 
 Daniel Nigro – producer , bass , guitar , drum programming , mellotron , mixing 
Rob Kinelski – mixing 
 Ryan Linvil – drum programming 
 Kate Brady – additional vocals 
 Yves Rothman – drum programming

Track listing
All tracks are written by Conan Gray

Charts

References 

2018 debut EPs
Republic Records EPs
Conan Gray EPs